Parduman Singh Brar (15 October 1927 – 22 March 2007) was an Indian athlete who specialized in shot put and discus throw events. He was one of the few Indians to have won multiple medals at the Asian Games.

Career
Brar was India's national champion in the shot put and discus throw events in the 1950s. He won his first national shot put event in Madras in 1958 and won the national discus throw events in 1954, 1958 and 1959. In the 1954 Asian Games in Manila, he won gold medals in the shot put and discus throw events, thus becoming the first athlete in Asia to achieve the feat. He continued his performance in the 1958 Asian Games in Tokyo, winning a gold in the shot put event and bronze in the discus throw event. In his last games appearance in 1962 in Jakarta, he won a silver medal in discus throw, thus completing his medal tally of five medals in three Asian games events. He was given the Arjuna Award by the Government of India in 1999 recognizing his contribution to Indian sports.

Death
Brar, paralysed after an accident in the early 1980s, died on 22 March 2007 in his native village in Punjab after prolonged illness. Poverty stricken, he died penniless.

References

1927 births
2007 deaths
Athletes from Punjab, India
People from Punjab, India
Indian male shot putters
Indian male discus throwers
Asian Games medalists in athletics (track and field)
Athletes (track and field) at the 1954 Asian Games
Athletes (track and field) at the 1958 Asian Games
Athletes (track and field) at the 1962 Asian Games
Asian Games gold medalists for India
Asian Games silver medalists for India
Asian Games bronze medalists for India
Medalists at the 1954 Asian Games
Medalists at the 1958 Asian Games
Medalists at the 1962 Asian Games
Athletes (track and field) at the 1954 British Empire and Commonwealth Games
Athletes (track and field) at the 1958 British Empire and Commonwealth Games
Commonwealth Games competitors for India
Recipients of the Arjuna Award